Alan Esmond Warner (born Birmingham, Warwickshire, England 12 May 1957) was an English cricketer who played for Worcestershire from 1982 to 1984 and for Derbyshire from 1985 to 1996.

As a right-handed batsman he played 272 innings in 200 first-class matches at an average of 17.10. As a right-arm medium-fast bowler he captured 426 wickets at an average of 31.45.

References

External links 

1957 births
English cricketers
Living people
Derbyshire cricketers
Worcestershire cricketers
Worcestershire Cricket Board cricketers